The 1983 Stockholm Open was a men's tennis tournament played on indoor hard courts and part of the 1983 Volvo Grand Prix and took place at the Kungliga tennishallen in Stockholm, Sweden. It was the 15th edition of the tournament and was held from 31 October through 6 November 1983. First-seeded Mats Wilander won the singles title.

Finals

Singles

 Mats Wilander defeated  Tomáš Šmíd, 6–1, 7–5
 It was Wilander's 8th singles title of the year and the 12th of his career.

Doubles

 Anders Järryd /  Hans Simonsson defeated  Peter Fleming /  Johan Kriek, 6–3, 6–4

References

External links
  
 ATP tournament profile
 ITF tournament edition details
 1983 Stockholm Open at SVT's open archive 

Stockholm Open
Stockholm Open
Stockholm Open
Stockholm Open
Stockholm Open
1980s in Stockholm